Mergasor District is a district in northern Erbil Governorate in Kurdistan Region.

Geography 
The district encompasses the five subdistricts Barzan, Goratu, Ble, Piran and Shirawan Mezn, with a total of 252 villages. It is located in the north of Erbil Governorate, close to the Iranian and the Turkish border.

Demographics 
Mergasor District is populated by different Kurdish tribes including the Barzani, Herki and the Mizûrî. Moreover, there is one Assyrian village named Bedyal. Religiously, the district is around 99.9% Muslim and 0.1% Christian.

Demographics

References

Districts of Erbil Governorate